Sheath pronounced as , may refer to:

 Scabbard, a sheath for holding a sword, knife, or other large blade, as well as guns, such as rifles.
 The outer covering of a cable
 Condom, a kind of contraception
 Debye sheath, a layer of a plasma in physics
 Heliosheath, the region of the heliosphere beyond the termination shock
 Koteka, a penis sheath worn by some natives of New Guinea
 Sheath (album), a 2003 techno album by LFO
 Sheath dress, a type of dress
 Kosha, an element in human being makeup according to Hinduist philosophy

Botany
 Leaf sheath, the leaf base when it forms a vertical coating surrounding the stem

Anatomy
 Carotid sheath, connective tissue around the neck's vascular compartment
 Myelin sheath, an insulating layer over the axon of a neuron
 Preputial sheath, protective skin around the penis or clitoris
 Clitoral hood
 Penile sheath, the foreskin into which a penis retracts
 Rectus sheath, the laminas around abdominal muscles
 Root sheath, the inner or epidermic coat around the root of a hair follicle
 Tendon sheath, a synovial membrane surrounding a tendon in, for example, the fingers
 Vagina, the internal structure of the female genitalia

See also
 Sheaf (disambiguation)
 Sheave, a pulley used for holding a belt or rope
 Sheathing (disambiguation)